Rhododendron rousei is a species of Rhododendron native to the Philippines.

References

Rhododendron
Flora of the Philippines